Rhodospatha densinervia is a species of flowering plant in the family Araceae. It is native to Colombia and Ecuador.

References

Flora of Colombia
Flora of Ecuador
densinervia